The Developmental Studies Hybridoma Bank (DSHB) is a National Resource established by the National Institutes of Health (NIH) in 1986 to bank and distribute at cost hybridomas and the monoclonal antibodies (mAbs) they produce to the basic science community worldwide. It is housed in the Department of Biology at the University of Iowa.

Mission
The mission of the DSHB is four-fold:
 Keep product prices low to facilitate research (currently 40.00 USD per ml of supernatant).
 Serve as a repository to relieve scientists of the time and expense of distributing hybridomas and the mAbs they produce.
 Assure the scientific community that mAbs with limited demand remain available.
 Maintain the highest product quality, provide prompt customer service and technical assistance.

Description
The DSHB is directed by David R. Soll at the University of Iowa. There are currently over 5000 hybridomas in the DSHB collection. The DSHB has obtained hybridomas from a variety of individuals and institutions, the latter including the Muscular Dystrophy Association, the National Cancer Institute, the NIH Common Fund, and the European Molecular Biology Laboratory (EMBL). The DSHB eagerly awaits new contributions. First time customers must agree to the DSHB terms of usage that products will be used for research purposes only, and that they cannot be commercialized or distributed to a third party. Researchers also agree to acknowledge both the DSHB and the contributing investigator and institution in publications that benefit from the use of DSHB products and provide to the DSHB citations of all publications.  Individuals or institutions can deposit hybridomas for distribution at no cost.  Contributing to the DSHB does not preclude the depositor from licensing cell lines for commercial purposes.  The DSHB does not own any contributed intellectual property.  The intellectual property remains that of the scientist and/or institution that banks the hybridomas.  The DSHB covers the operating costs of maintaining, improving, producing and distributing products in the collection.

History
The DSHB was created in 1986 by the NIH to bank and distribute hybridomas and the monoclonal antibodies (mAbs) they produce to the general scientific community in order to facilitate research.  The DSHB was moved from Johns Hopkins University to the University of Iowa in 1996, and placed under the directorship of David R. Soll. The DSHB has been self-funded since 1997 and relies on no outside funding.

Popular Collections

Cardiac Muscle
CD Markers
Cell Adhesion
Cell Biomarkers 
Cytoskeleton
Disease Biomarkers
EMBL Protein Binders (Affinomics)
Enzymes
Epitope Tags
Extracellular Matrix
Microbes (Bacteria, Fungi, Viruses)
Neurodevelopment
Muscular Dystrophy Association mAbs
NIH Common Fund Protein Capture Reagents
NIH NCI CPTAC Cancer Targets
Receptors
Organelle-specific Biomarkers
RNA/DNA Regulation
Secreted Proteins
Epitope Tags
Skeletal Muscle
Transcription Factors

Noteworthy Depositors

Nobel Prize and Alfred P. Sloan, Jr. Prize winner J. Michael Bishop deposited the anti c-MYC hybridoma 9e 10 

Nobel Prize winner Sir John Gurdon deposited MyoD clone D7F2

Nobel Prize winner Eric F. Wieschaus deposited 7 hybridomas

National Academy of Sciences Members who have deposited hybridomas
Utpal Banerjee  (1 hybridoma deposit)   University of California, Los Angeles
Philip A. Beachy (5 hybridoma deposits)         Stanford University
Seymour Benzer (7 hybridoma deposits)         California Institute of Technology
J. Michael Bishop (1 hybridoma deposits)        University of California, San Francisco
Helen Blau  (11 hybridoma deposits)   Stanford University
Kevin P. Campbell (9 hybridoma deposits)     The University of Iowa
Constance L. Cepko (1 hybridoma deposit)  Harvard University
Max Cooper  (1 hybridoma deposit)   Emory University
Marilyn Gist Farquhar  (1 hybridoma deposit)   University of California, San Diego
John Gurdon (1 hybridoma deposit)     University of Cambridge
Corey S. Goodman (25 hybridoma deposits)   University of California, Berkeley
Thomas M. Jessell  (36 hybridoma deposits)    Columbia University
Robb Krumlauf  (1 hybridoma deposit)   Stowers Institute for Medical Research
N. M. Le Douarin (6 hybridoma deposits)         CNRS Institute of Embryology
Gerald M. Rubin (20 hybridoma deposits)  HHMI /     Janelia Research Campus
Joshua R. Sanes (11 hybridoma deposits)          Harvard University
S. J. Singer (1 hybridoma deposit)                       University of California, San Diego
Roland Nusse (2 hybridoma deposits)                       Stanford University
Gertrude Schupbach  (10 hybridoma deposits)   Princeton University
Timothy A. Springer (7 hybridoma deposits)    Harvard University
Masatoshi Takeichi (7 hybridoma deposits)      RIKEN
Stephen T. Warren (1 hybridoma deposit)      Emory University
Zena Werb (1 hybridoma deposit)                     University of California, San Francisco
Eric F. Wieschaus (7  hybridoma deposits)          Princeton University

References

External links 
 Developmental Studies Hybridoma Bank

Developmental biology